The 2014 United States Shadow Senator election in the District of Columbia took place on November 4, 2014, to elect a shadow member to the United States Senate to represent the District of Columbia. The member was only recognized by the District of Columbia and not officially sworn or seated by the United States Senate. Incumbent Paul Strauss won his closest primary challenge against businessman Pete Ross and was easily elected to a fourth term.

Primary elections
Party primaries took place on April 1, 2014.

Democratic primary

Candidates
 Pete Ross, furniture businessman, landlord and former Army captain; candidate for Shadow Senator in 2012
 Paul Strauss, incumbent Shadow Senator

Results

Other primaries
D.C. Statehood Green candidate David Schwartzman and Libertarian candidate John Daniel were unopposed in their party primaries. A Republican primary was held with no candidates.

General election
The general election took place on November 4, 2014.

Candidates
 John Daniel (Libertarian), tech entrepreneur
 Glenda Richmond (Independent), DC Statehood Leadership Coalition (DCSLC) founder and president
 David Schwartzman (D.C. Statehood Green), former professor at Howard University
 Paul Strauss (Democratic), incumbent

Results

References

External links
 
 
  (Affiliate of the U.S. League of Women Voters)
 

United States Shadow Senator
2014